João Carlos Serra Ferreira Pereira (born 11 April 1965) is a Portuguese football manager and former player. As a player he was a winger.

Playing career
Born in Luanda, Portuguese Angola to Portuguese parents, Pereira started playing football with A.C. Marinhense, and went on to spend one season in the Segunda Liga with the club. From 1985 to 1987 he represented Académica de Coimbra in the Primeira Liga, but was never more than a reserve player.

Pereira retired professionally in June 1990 at the age of only 25, after spells in the second division with Moreirense F.C. and C.D. Trofense.

Coaching career
Pereira began coaching aged just 32, starting with Marinhense in division three and moving in 2001 to fellow league side S.C. Pombal. His top-flight debut came in the 2003–04 campaign with another former club, Académica, which he led to the 13th place.

In early 2005, after being fired by the Students, Pereira signed with C.D. Nacional and moved shortly after to Moreirense, then spent the next year without a team until he joined Kuwait's Al-Tadamon SC. After leading G.D. Estoril Praia to the fourth place in 2008–09's second tier, he returned to the top division by signing a two-year contract with C.F. Os Belenenses, which had previously been relegated only to avoid it later due to C.F. Estrela da Amadora's serious financial problems.

On 21 December 2009, following a series of poor results (culminating in the 1–0 away loss against U.D. Leiria), Pereira resigned at Belenenses although they were still above the relegation zone– eventually not managing to retain their status. On 9 December of the following year he moved to Cyprus, being appointed at Ermis Aradippou FC and asking to be released at the end of the season after managing to avoid First Division relegation by registering a club-record 30 points in the competition, 38 after the second stage.

Pereira replaced countryman João Alves at the helm of Swiss club Servette FC on 28 November 2011, being replaced in April 2012 by his predecessor. During his tenure they won four Super League matches, drew two and lost seven.

After six years working with Aspire Academy, Pereira returned for another spell as Académica coach on 18 November 2019, with the team now in the second division. He went back to Switzerland the following August, being appointed at Grasshopper Club Zürich in the Challenge League. He was dismissed on 12 May 2021 following three consecutive defeats although the club topped the league table, being eventually promoted.

Pereira re-joined Académica for the third time on 22 September 2021, with the side bottom of the second tier. He was relieved of his duties in November, having collected five losses in as many games.

References

External links

1965 births
Living people
Angolan people of Portuguese descent
Footballers from Luanda
Portuguese footballers
Association football wingers
Primeira Liga players
Liga Portugal 2 players
Segunda Divisão players
A.C. Marinhense players
Associação Académica de Coimbra – O.A.F. players
Moreirense F.C. players
C.D. Trofense players
U.R. Mirense players
Portuguese football managers
Primeira Liga managers
Liga Portugal 2 managers
Associação Académica de Coimbra – O.A.F. managers
C.D. Nacional managers
Moreirense F.C. managers
G.D. Estoril Praia managers
C.F. Os Belenenses managers
Kuwait Premier League managers
Al Tadhamon SC managers
Cypriot First Division managers
Ermis Aradippou FC managers
Swiss Super League managers
Swiss Challenge League managers
Servette FC managers
Grasshopper Club Zürich managers
Portuguese expatriate football managers
Portuguese expatriate sportspeople in Kuwait
Portuguese expatriate sportspeople in Cyprus
Portuguese expatriate sportspeople in Switzerland
Expatriate football managers in Kuwait
Expatriate football managers in Cyprus
Expatriate football managers in Switzerland